William Milton "Riley" Hern (December 5, 1878 – June 24, 1929) was a Canadian professional ice hockey goaltender. He was the first professional goaltender to play on a Stanley Cup-winning team.

Biography
Hern began playing ice hockey at an early age, playing for school teams in St. Marys and Stratford, playing both as a goaltender and a forward. Hern played for Stratford Legionnaires from 1898 to 1901.

He began his professional career with the Pittsburgh Keystones of the Western Pennsylvania Hockey League (WPHL) during the 1901–02 season. In his first season, Hern led the league in wins, with nine in 14 games. Hern, as a result, was named to the WPHL All-Star Team. However, in the next season, he led the league in losses, losing 10 out of 11 games. 
In the 1904–05 season, Hern played with the Portage Lakes Hockey Club of the International Professional Hockey League (IPHL). He played, in total, three seasons with Portage Lakes.

In the 1906–07 season, Hern joined the Montreal Wanderers of the Eastern Canadian Amateur Hockey Association (ECAHA). Hern posted a 10–0 regular season record in his first season with the Wanderers. The Wanderers won the Stanley Cup four times, three straight seasons, from 1906 to 1908, and in 1910. The Wanderers also successfully defended the Cup in six out of seven challenges in that time span. The only challenge they lost was against the Kenora Thistles in January 1907; the Wanderers reclaimed the Cup in their own successful challenge two months later.

Hern retired from playing professional ice hockey in 1911, at the age of 30. Hern went on to become a successful businessman, owning a haberdashery in Montreal. He was involved in organizing various ice hockey leagues and printing schedules. Hern also served as an NHL referee and a goal judge.

Hern died at Ross Memorial Pavilion of a heart ailment that had been ailing him for six weeks on June 24, 1929. He was inducted posthumously into the Hockey Hall of Fame in 1963.

Hern's grandson is Allan F. Nicholls, who played the role of Charlestown Chiefs captain Johnny Upton in the 1977 film Slap Shot.

Riley Hern is regarded by some as being among the best goaltenders of all time, coming in at 25th overall according to veteran hockey writers Kevin Allen and Bob Duff in their 2002 book Without Fear: Hockey's 50 Greatest Goaltenders.

Career statistics

Regular season

Playoffs

* Stanley Cup Champion.

References

Bibliography

Notes

External links

 

1878 births
1929 deaths
Canadian ice hockey goaltenders
Hockey Hall of Fame inductees
Ice hockey people from Ontario
Montreal Wanderers (NHA) players
People from St. Mary's, Ontario
Pittsburgh Keystones (ice hockey) players
Portage Lakes Hockey Club players
Stanley Cup champions